The 1916 Arizona Wildcats football team represented the University of Arizona as an independent during the 1916 college football season. In its third season under head coach Pop McKale, the team compiled a 5–3 record and outscored all opponents by a total of 247 to 93. The team captain was James William Hendry.

Schedule

References

Arizona
Arizona Wildcats football seasons
Arizona Wildcats football